Anatoli (Ανατολή) was a Karamanli Turkish (Turkish with Greek characters) newspaper published by Evangelinos Misalaides, the first in that language made in the Ottoman Empire. It operated 1850-1922, making it the one in that language with the longest length of publication. N. T. Soullides later became the editor.

Anatoli favoured Sultan of the Ottoman Empire Abdulhamid II and promoted institutions of higher education set up during his rule.

See also
 Media of the Ottoman Empire
 Servet - A newspaper originally intended to be in Karamanli Turkish

References

Notes

1850 establishments in the Ottoman Empire
1922 disestablishments in the Ottoman Empire
Defunct newspapers published in the Ottoman Empire
Turkish-language newspapers
Publications established in 1850
Publications disestablished in 1922